Stephen Meredith House is a historic home located in South Coventry Township, Chester County, Pennsylvania.  It was built in 1844, and is a two-story, three bay by four bay, stone dwelling in the Greek Revival style.  The front facade features a pedimented portico with Doric order columns.  Also on the property is a contributing barn dated to about 1780-1790 and a stone arch bridge dated to about 1844.

The house was added to the National Register of Historic Places in 1993.

References

Houses on the National Register of Historic Places in Pennsylvania
Greek Revival houses in Pennsylvania
Houses completed in 1844
Houses in Chester County, Pennsylvania
National Register of Historic Places in Chester County, Pennsylvania